Paska ("Easter"; ,  ,  "Easter"; ; ultimately from ,  ,  "Passover") is a Ukrainian Easter bread tradition and particularly spread in countries with predominant Eastern Orthodox religious or cultural connections to the ancient Byzantine Empire. Paska breads are a traditional element in the Easter holidays of Ukraine,  Armenia,  Belarus, Romania, Russia, Georgia, Moldova and parts of Bulgaria, as well as Turkey, Iran and the Assyrian–Chaldean–Syriac diaspora. Due to its geographical closeness, it is also widespread in Slovakia. Meanwhile, it is also eaten in countries with immigrant populations from Eastern Europe such as the United States, Canada and the United Kingdom.

Etymology and origins
Easter is called in the Ukrainian language  whilst in Russian it is spelt . The Ukrainian word  is traditionally used to describe the Easter bread in Ukraine whilst Вели́кдень is used to denote the day. Whilst Russia has its own Easter bread called  and the word  is used to denote the day. The word is connected to Ancient Greek word  and Georgian:  ("Easter"), derived from the Orthodox believers in Byzantine Empire. The name is connected to the Jewish holiday of Pesach.

In Finland the name  ("Easter bread") is used, because  is an obscenity in Finnish meaning "shit".

Christian symbolism

The Christian faithful in many Eastern Christian countries eat this bread during Easter. Christian symbolism is associated with features of paska type breads. The inside of paska can be a swirl of yellow and white that is said to represent the resurrection of Jesus while the white represents the Holy Spirit. Other versions include chocolate, rice, or even savoury mixtures based on cheese. A version is made with maraschino cherries added to symbolize royal jewels in honor of the resurrection of Jesus.

Traditional ingredients

Paska is made with milk, butter, eggs, flour, and sugar, except for the Romanian pască where the recipe most commonly includes sweet cream, cottage cheese, and/or sour cream along with eggs, sugar, raisins, and rum. An egg and water mixture is used as a glaze.

Ukraine

In Ukraine it is tradition to fill your Easter basket (koshyk) with Easter eggs (pysanky), Easter bread (paska), sausage (kovbasa), butter, salt and other ceremonial foods on Holy Saturday (Easter Eve). On Easter morning, after the liturgy and the blessing of the paska and other staples, everyone returns home to feast on the eggs, cold meats, and other goods that were blessed at church. After the matins all the people in the congregation exchange Easter greetings, give each other krashanky, and then hurry home with their baskets of blessed food (sviachene). In eastern Ukraine they go home, place the sviachene on the table, and the oldest member of the family opens the cloths in which the food is wrapped, slices pieces from each item, and distributes them to members of the family along with a piece of unleavened bread that has also been blessed.

In Western Ukraine, especially in the Hutsul region, the people first walk around the house three times. Only then do they enter the house, ceremoniously open the bundle (dorinnyk) over the heads of the children, and sit down to the table to break their fast. Modern pasky usually have a white glaze made from sugar and egg and are decorated on top with coloured wheat grains or poppy seeds. However, an old custom, which is still practised in some Ukrainian regions and diasporas, is to create dough ornaments for the paska. The symbolism of these ornaments is connected with spring themes: the awakening of nature, resurrection and rebirth. Birds, especially larks, as heralds of spring, took a much-deserved place on pasky.

Assyrian paska
In Iran and the diaspora, Assyrians will eat a paska cake on Easter, Ida Gura. The tall cake is decorated with a cross on top to represent Calvary, the place of Jesus' crucifixion, and surrounded with colored eggs to symbolize the people who visited Jesus during his death and were at his cross.

Eaten with other foods
Paska is eaten with hrudka, also called syrek, a bland sweet custard similar to cheese made from separated eggs and milk and beets mixed with horseradish (chren/hrin) and kovbasa.

Pască

Pască is a traditional Romanian and Moldovan pastry. Especially made for Easter, pască is a tart with a cozonac dough base filled with fresh cheese like urdă or cottage cheese, raisins, eggs and sugar. Other variants include sour cream, chocolate, or berries fillings.

See also
 Challah
 Cozonac or Kozunak is the Romanian and Bulgarian name for a type of Easter Bread
 Kolach
 Kulich, Russian paska bread
 Paskha, Russian Easter dish made from quark
 List of sweet breads

References

External links

Sweet breads
Yeast breads
Easter bread
Assyrian cuisine
Iranian breads
Moldovan cuisine
Romanian cuisine
Russian cuisine
Slovak cuisine
Ukrainian cuisine
Cuisine of the Midwestern United States
Slavic Easter traditions
Braided egg breads
Cheese dishes